Robak is a surname. Notable people with the surname include:

Adam Robak (born 1957), Polish fencer
Colby Robak (born 1990), Canadian ice hockey player
Håkon Robak (1905–1982), Norwegian forester
Jennie Robak (1932–2014), American politician
Kim M. Robak (born 1955), American lawyer, lobbyist and politician
Marcin Robak (born 1982), Polish footballer

See also
 

Polish-language surnames